Lillian Greene-Chamberlain (born 1941) is an American educator and former track and field athlete.

Since she began running at the age of 16 in 1957, she has had considerable success as an athlete. She was the first U.S. national champion in the 440-yard run indoors, the first African-American woman to represent the U.S. in the 400m and 800m in international competitions, a three-time U.S. national champion and American record holder, a Pan American Games champion, and a three-time U.S. All-American national team member.

In 2007, she was named one of the 100 Most Influential Sports Educators in America by Business Wire. She served on the President’s Council on Physical Fitness and Sports from 2006–2008. 
She is also a former Women's Sports Foundation trustee.

References

1941 births
Living people
American female sprinters
Track and field athletes from New York (state)
African-American female track and field athletes
21st-century African-American people
21st-century African-American women
20th-century African-American sportspeople
20th-century African-American women
20th-century African-American people